Weaste Cemetery is a public cemetery in Weaste, Salford, Greater Manchester, in England. Opened in 1857, it is the oldest of Salford's four cemeteries, covering 39 acres and containing over 332,000 graves.

Location

The cemetery lies south of Eccles New Road (A57 road) and is approached via Cemetery Road.

History
Salford was one of the earliest British municipalities to recognise that churchyards were getting full and that alternative burial grounds were required. When originally opened the cemetery included four chapels and a glazed summer house, which have since all been demolished.

The first interment was that of the very popular MP, Joseph Brotherton, who had campaigned for the cemetery and died just before its completion.  Brotherton died on 7 January 1857 and his funeral took place a week later on 14 January.  The cemetery was formally opened on 1 September 1857.

The original  site was becoming full and a  area bought earlier with the intention of being used as an addition had been compulsorily purchased for development of the Manchester Ship Canal. At that time, the cemetery was making a profit of around £2,500 per annum.

During the Second World War at Christmas 1940, a German bomb fell on the cemetery during a raid on the nearby docks. Several headstones are still peppered with marks and holes caused by the shrapnel.

Salford Council have mapped out a heritage trail for the cemetery and noteworthy graves have been provided with information panels. Occasional guided tours of the cemetery also take place. Several of the monuments in the cemetery are Grade II listed.

Notable interments
 Joseph Brotherton (1783–1857) - first MP for Salford
 Martha Brotherton (–1861) - wife of above and writer of first vegetarian cookbook
 Elkanah Armitage (1794–1876) - Lord Mayor of Manchester
 Charles Hallé (1819–1895) - founder of Hallé Orchestra
 Mark Addy (1838–1890) - awarded Albert Medal for saving over 50 people from drowning in the Irwell
 Eddie Colman (1936–1958) - Manchester United player killed in Munich air disaster 
 William Norman, VC (1832–1896) - Awarded Victoria Cross for courage in the Crimea War
 Edward Hardy (1884–1960) - MP for Salford South
 William Johnson Galloway (1868-1931) - MP for Manchester South West
 Four survivors of the Charge of the Light Brigade

War graves
The cemetery contains the graves of 373 Commonwealth service personnel who died during the First and Second World Wars, plus numerous memorials to servicemen buried abroad. Some of the 274 First World War dead lie in war grave plots in both the Church of England and Roman Catholic sections, each plot having a Screen Memorial listing the dead buried within them, while the 99 Second World War dead are scattered amidst the cemetery and there is also a special memorial listing 7 personnel buried in graves that could not be marked.

References

Cemeteries in Greater Manchester
Buildings and structures in Salford
1857 establishments in England